Adolf Höschle (20 July 1899 – 14 December 1969) was a German international footballer and later manager.

References

1899 births
1969 deaths
Association football defenders
German footballers
German football managers
Germany international footballers
Stuttgarter Kickers players
Stuttgarter Kickers managers
Footballers from Stuttgart